Computer-aided facility management (CAFM) is the support of facility management by information technology. The supply of information about the facilities is the center of attention. The tools of the CAFM are called CAFM software, CAFM applications or CAFM systems.

History 
The International Facility Management Association (IFMA) defines facility management as the practice of coordinating the physical workplace with the people and work of the organization. It integrates the principles of business administration, architecture and the behavioral and engineering sciences. As such, facility management has been practiced, whether specifically identified as its own discipline or not, since the inception of the business organization. It has evolved over the years through the development and codification of processes into a clearly defined field of expertise.

See also 
 1:5:200
 Building information modeling (BIM)
 Computerized maintenance management system (CMMS)
 Integrated workplace management system (IWMS)
 Property management system

References

Business software
Information technology management
Property management